No Time to Marry is a 1938 American comedy film directed by Harry Lachman and starring Richard Arlen, Mary Astor and Lionel Stander.

Partial cast
 Richard Arlen as Perry Brown  
 Mary Astor as Kay McGowan  
 Lionel Stander as Al Vogel  
 Virginia Dale as Eleanor Winthrop  
 Marjorie Gateson as Mrs. Pettensall  
 Thurston Hall as Pettensall  
 Arthur Loft as Wyatt Blake  
 Jay Adler as Hess  
 Matt McHugh as Abernathy  
 Paul Hurst as Sergeant  
 George Humbert as Buenocasa

References

Bibliography
 Goble, Alan. The Complete Index to Literary Sources in Film. Walter de Gruyter, 1999.

External links

1938 films
American comedy films
1938 comedy films
Films directed by Harry Lachman
American black-and-white films
Columbia Pictures films
Films produced by William Perlberg
1930s English-language films
1930s American films